This is a list of aviation-related events from 2010.

Deadliest crash
The deadliest crash of this year was Air India Express Flight 812, a Boeing 737 which crashed in a runway overrun at Mangalore, India on 22 May, killing 158 of the 166 people on board.

Events

January
2 January
 A package containing the explosive RDX is randomly placed in the luggage of an unknowing passenger at Poprad-Tatry Airport in Slovakia as part of a bomb-detection training exercise, but police fail to remove the package afterwards, and the luggage continues onto a Danube Wings flight to Dublin Airport where the unsuspecting passenger retrieves his explosive-laden luggage and takes it to his Dublin home, resulting in a bomb alert and his arrest three days later. The man is released after the Slovak government admits he is blameless.

13 January
 German airline Blue Wings ceases operations.

19 January
 Japan Airlines files for protection from bankruptcy.

20 January
 British Prime Minister Gordon Brown announces that commercial flights between the United Kingdom and the Yemen would be suspended, owing to British concerns over terrorist activity in Yemen, and will not resume until the security situation in Yemen improves.

21 January
 Cargolux Flight 7933, a Boeing 747-4R7F, strikes an airport maintenance van on landing at Luxembourg International Airport and sustains a damaged tyre. Three investigations are launched into the incident.

 23 January
 United Eagle Airlines is renamed Chengdu Airlines.

24 January
 Taban Air Flight 6437, a Tupolev Tu-154M, crashes on landing at Mashhad International Airport in Iran. All 170 people on board escape from the burning aircraft.

25 January
 Ethiopian Airlines Flight 409, a Boeing 737-8AS, crashes into the Mediterranean shortly after take-off from Beirut Rafic Hariri International Airport in Beirut, Lebanon. All 90 people on board die.

26 January
 Spanish airline Quantum Air ceased operations.

31 January
 American carrier Northwest Airlines is merged into Delta Air Lines.

February
11 February
Trigana Air Service Flight 168, an ATR 42-300F, makes a forced landing in a paddy field at Bone, Indonesia. Two people are seriously injured and the aircraft was written off.

15 February
 Spanish airline Hola Airlines ceases operations.

18 February
 After setting fire to his house and leaving behind a suicide note expressing displeasure with government and taxation, Andrew Joseph Stack III crashes his Piper Dakota into an office building housing an Internal Revenue Service (IRS) field office in Austin, Texas, killing himself and an IRS manager and injuring 13 others, two of them seriously.

28 February
 Eurofly and Meridiana merge to form Meridiana Fly.

March
22 March
 Aviastar Flight 1906, a Tupolev Tu-204, crashes on approach to Domodedovo International Airport, Moscow. The aircraft is written off, the first hull loss for Aviastar and the first of a Tu-204.

25 March
 Scottish airline Highland Airways ceases operations.

31 March
 Canadian airline Skyservice ceases operations.
 Aloha Airlines ceases operations and declares bankruptcy. It halts all passenger operations and transfers all of its cargo operations to Aloha Air Cargo.

April
8 April
 British Airways and Iberia confirm that they have agreed to merge.

10 April
 A Polish Air Force Tupolev Tu-154M carrying the Polish President Lech Kaczyński and many other Polish officials crashes in poor visibility on approach to Smolensk North Airport in Smolensk, Russia, killing all 96 people on board.

12 April
 Air Jamaica ceases operations and its routes are taken over by Caribbean Airlines.

13 April
 Merpati Nusantara Airlines Flight 836, a Boeing 737-300, overruns the runway at Rendani Airport, Manokwari, Indonesia. All 103 passengers and crew escape alive.

 Aerounion – Aerotransporte de Carga Union Flight 302, an Airbus A300B4F, crashes on approach to General Mariano Escobedo International Airport, Monterrey, Mexico, killing all five crew and one person in a car struck by the aircraft.

15 April
 Following the second eruption of Eyjafjallajökull in Iceland, large areas of controlled airspace were closed, causing widespread suspension of services across Europe.

21 April
 Pacific East Asia Cargo Airlines Flight 7815, an Antonov An-12, crashes on approach to Clark International Airport, Philippines after an in-flight fire. Three of the six crew die.

22 April
 On Earth Day, the United States Navy conducts a flight test at Naval Air Station Patuxent River, Maryland, of an F/A-18 Super Hornet powered by a biofuel blend. The aircraft, nicknamed the "Green Hornet," flies for about 45 minutes on a 50/50 blend of conventional jet fuel and a biofuel made from Camelina sativa. The flight is the first of a planned 15 test flights totaling about 23 flight-hours, scheduled for completion by mid-June 2010.

May
12 May
 Afriqiyah Airways Flight 771, an Airbus A330-202, crashes on approach to Tripoli International Airport, Libya, killing 103 people.

15 May
 A Blue Wing Airlines Antonov An-28 crashes shortly after take-off from Godo Holo Airstrip killing all eight on board.

17 May
 Pamir Airways Flight 112, an Antonov An-24, crashes in the Salang Pass killing all 43 on board.

22 May
 Air India Express Flight 812, a Boeing 737-800, crashes at Mangalore International Airport with the loss of 162 lives.

26 May
 Iraqi Airways ceases operations.
 Launched from a B-52H Stratofortress over the Pacific Ocean, the Boeing X-51A Waverider makes a successful first flight, reaching nearly Mach 5. It is the first time in history that an aircraft flies powered by a practical thermally balanced hydrocarbon-fueled scramjet engine.

28 May
 The first Solar Impulse aircraft, HB-SIA, the first solar-powered aircraft capable of flying both day and night thanks to batteries charged by solar power that provide it with power during darkness, makes its first flight powered entirely by solar energy, charging its batteries in flight. The flight takes place at Payerne Airport outside Payerne, Switzerland.

June
 The European Union (EU) and the United States sign phase two of the EU–US Open Skies Agreement.

6 June
 A wheel-well stowaway inside a Boeing 747 survives a flight from Vienna to London.

19 June
 Berlin Air Services Douglas DC-3 D-CXXX crashed shortly after take-off from Berlin Schönefeld Airport on a local sightseeing flight. Eight people were injured and the aircraft was substantially damaged.

21 June
 A Cameroon Aero Service CASA C-212 Aviocar crashes in the Republic of the Congo, killing all eleven people on board, including Australian mining magnate Ken Talbot.

July
8 July
 The first Solar Impulse aircraft, HB-SIA, the first solar-powered aircraft capable of both day and night flight thanks to its batteries charged by solar power, makes its first overnight flight, taking off from Payerne Airport outside Payerne, Switzerland, and returning after 26 hours 10 minutes 19 seconds in the air, the first overnight flight by a solar-powered aircraft and the longest flight in history up to this time by a manned solar-powered aircraft.

18 July
 The Boeing 787 Dreamliner makes its first international appearance at the Farnborough Airshow, UK.

27 July
 A Lufthansa Cargo McDonnell Douglas MD-11 crashes at King Khalid International Airport, Riyadh, Saudi Arabia.

28 July
Airblue Flight 202, an Airbus A321, crashes in the Margalla Hills north of Islamabad, killing all 152 aboard in the deadliest air accident in Pakistan's history.
Boeing C-17 Globemaster III 00-0173 of the United States Air Force crashed near Elmendorf Air Force Base killing all four people on board.

August
1 August
 The Convention on Cluster Munitions, which bans the use, transfer, and stockpiling of cluster bombs by signatory countries, goes into effect, six months after its ratification by its 30th signatory country.

2 August
The  craft has  span flapping wings.
 The Mexican airline Mexicana files for insolvency proceedings in Mexico and bankruptcy protection in the United States.

3 August
 Katekavia Flight 9357, an Antonov An-24, crashes in Igarka, Russia, killing eleven people.

9 August
 A de Havilland Canada DHC-3T Turbo Otter crashes near Aleknagik, Alaska, killing five people aboard, including former United States Senator Ted Stevens. Former NASA Administrator and later EADS North America CEO Sean O'Keefe is among the four survivors.

13 August
 Spanish airline Andalus Lineas Aereas ceases operations.

16 August
 AIRES Flight 8250,a Boeing 737-73V, crashes short of the runway at Gustavo Rojas Pinilla International Airport, San Andrés, Colombia and breaks into three sections. One passenger dies from a heart attack following the accident. The other 124 passengers and six crew survive.

24 August
 Saudi airline SAMA ceases operations.
 Agni Air Flight 101, a Dornier 228, crashes near Shikharpur, Nepal killing all 14 people on board.
 Henan Airlines Flight 8387, an Embraer E190 LR, overruns the runway on landing at Lindu Airport, China, killing 42 of the 96 people on board.

25 August
 A Filair Let L-410 Turbolet crashes short of the runway at Bandundu Airport, killing all 14 people on board.

27 August
 Five days of flight testing at Edwards Air Force Base, California, of alternative fuels by a United States Air Force C-17 Globemaster III end with the C-17 flying using a blend of 50 percent conventional JP-8 jet fuel, 25 percent HRJ biofuel made from beef tallow, and 25 percent coal-based fuel made through the Fischer–Tropsch process, becoming the first United States Department of Defense aircraft to fly on such a blend and the first aircraft to operate from Edwards using a fuel derived from beef tallow. The flight is a culmination of a series of test flights, with the C-17 flying using JP-8 in three of its engines and a 50/50 blend of JP-8 and biofuel in one engine on 23 August, followed by a flight with the same 50/50 blend in all four engines on 24 August.
28 August
 The Mexican airline Mexicana de Aviacion suspends operations due to insolvency.

September
3 September
 UPS Airlines Flight 6, a Boeing 747-44AF, crashes shortly after take-off from Dubai International Airport, killing both crew and destroying the aircraft.

4 September
 A Fletcher FU24 crashed on take-off from the Fox Glacier, killing all nine people on board.

5 September
 A De Havilland Tiger Moth crashes into spectators at an air show at the Lauf-Lillinghof airfield near Nuremberg, Germany, killing one person and injuring 38, five of them seriously. Four years later, a trial in Hersbrucker District Court determined that the cause of the crash was pilot error, finding the pilot guilty of "… fahrlässiger Tötung und fahrlässiger Körperverletzung …" ("involuntary manslaughter and negligent injury").

7 September
 Alrosa Mirny Air Enterprise Flight 514, a Tupolev Tu-154M, has a total electrical failure in flight and makes an emergency landing at Izhma Airport, but overruns the runway. All 81 passengers and crew escaped uninjured. The aircraft involved was repaired in 2011.

13 September
Conviasa Flight 2350, a ATR 42–400, crashes shortly after take-off from Manuel Carlos Piar Guayana Airport, Ciudad Guayana, Venezuela, killing 17 and injuring 23.

30 September
 After Pakistani troops at a border post along the border with Afghanistan fire warning shots at North Atlantic Treaty Organization (NATO) attack helicopters flying a combat mission over Afghan territory against Afghan insurgents near the border, the helicopters mistake them for insurgents and return fire, killing three Pakistanis.

October
9 October
Italian airline Livingston suspends flight operations. The Italian Civil Aviation Authority (ENAC) will revoke its air operator's certificate on 14 October.

12 October

29 October
 A terrorist plot to send bombs by air freight from Yemen to the United States via the United Kingdom is uncovered.

November
4 November
Qantas Flight 32, an Airbus A380, sustains an uncontained engine failure over Batam Island, Indonesia. Falling debris injured one person on the ground. The aircraft returned to Singapore Changi Airport.
Aero Caribbean Flight 883, an ATR 72, crashes at Guasimal, Cuba, killing all 68 people on board.

5 November
 A Jahangir Siddiqui Air Beechcraft 1900 crashes near Karachi, Pakistan, killing all 21 people on board.

28 November
Sun Way Flight 4412, an Ilyushin Il-76, crashes in a populated area of Karachi, Pakistan, shortly after taking off from Jinnah International Airport, killing all eight persons on board and two on the ground.

29 November
The shareholders of British Airways and Iberia approve the merger of the two airlines.

December
 Turkey sends two firefighting aircraft to Israel to assist in aerial firefighting efforts against the 2010 Mount Carmel forest fire.

3 December
South East Airlines Flight 372, a Tupolev Tu-154M, crashes on landing at Domodedovo International Airport, Moscow, Russia. Of the 168 people on board, two passengers were killed.

15 December
 A Tara Air de Havilland Canada DHC-6 Twin Otter crashes into a mountain shortly after departure from Lamidanda Airport, Nepal. The aircraft was operating a chartered passenger flight to Tribhuvan International Airport, Kathmandu, Nepal. All 19 passengers and crew were killed.
 Last operation by a Harrier jump jet in United Kingdom service, from RAF Cottesmore.

First flights
 Grob G 120TP
 Wild DoubleEnder

January
 26 January 
 Kawasaki C-2 - 08-1201
 29 January 
 Sukhoi T-50

February
 Corvus Racer 540
 8 February
 Boeing 747-8. - N747EX

March
 10 March
 KAI KUH-1 Surion
 18 March
 Avicopter AC313
 29 March
 HAL Light Combat Helicopter

April
28 April
 Antonov An-158

July
8 July
Boeing F-15SE Silent Eagle

September
10 September
 Eurocopter X3

November
 Shaanxi Y-9

December
30 December
TAI Anka

Retirements

September
17 September
 Boeing T-43

December
 General Dynamics F-111 by the Royal Australian Air Force, the last operator of the type.

Deaths
19 July
 David Warren, Australian aviation scientist, inventor of the cockpit voice recorder (b. 1925)

References

 
Aviation by year